Herbert James "Burt" Munro (Bert in his youth; 25 March 1899 – 6 January 1978) was a motorcycle racer from New Zealand, famous for setting an under-1,000 cc world record, at Bonneville, on the 26th of August 1967. This record still stands; Munro was 68 and was riding a 47-year-old machine when he set his last record.

Working from his home in Invercargill, he spent 20 years  highly modifying his 1920 Indian motorcycle that he had bought that same year. Munro set his first New Zealand speed record in 1938 and later set seven more. He travelled to compete at the Bonneville Salt Flats, attempting to set world speed records. During his ten visits to the salt flats, he set three speed records, one of which still stands.

His efforts, and success, are the basis of the film The World's Fastest Indian (2005), starring Anthony Hopkins, and an earlier 1971 short documentary film Burt Munro: Offerings to the God of Speed, both directed by Roger Donaldson.

Early life 
Munro was born in 1899 to William Munro, a farmer and Lily Agnes Robinson in Invercargill. His twin sister died at birth and Munro grew up on a farm in Edendale, east of Invercargill.  His grandfather was from northern Scotland and settled on a farm in Invercargill.

Munro's interest in speed began at an early age, riding the family's fastest horse across the farm, despite the complaints of his father. Trips via train to the Invercargill port were a rare source of excitement, and the arrival of cars, motorcycles and aircraft added to Burt's eagerness to join the world outside his farm. As Munro's family discouraged his endeavours outside farm life, he became constantly bored with daily routine. At the outbreak of the First World War, he intended to go to war as soon as he was old enough, for a chance to see the world.

Munro remained on the family farm until the end of the First World War, when his father sold the farm. At that time, Munro worked on the Otira Tunnel construction until recalled to work with his father on a newly purchased farm. After this he became a professional speedway rider, but returned home to the family farm at the start of the Great Depression. Finding work as a motorcycle salesman and mechanic, he raced motorcycles and rose to the top of the New Zealand motorcycle scene, racing on Oreti Beach and later in Melbourne, Australia.

After the Second World War, Munro and his wife divorced, and he subsequently gave up work to reside in a lock-up garage.

Challenges

Munro's Indian Scout was an early model, the 627th Scout to leave the American factory.

Munro's two greatest challenges while modifying his bike were his lack of money and that he worked full-time as a motorcycle salesman. He would often work overnight on his bikes (he had a 1936 Velocette MSS as well), then he would go to work in the morning, having had no sleep. Being of modest means, he would often make his own parts and tools instead of having them professionally built. He would cast parts in old tins, make his own barrels, pistons, flywheels, and such; his micrometer was an old spoke.

In its final stages, the Indian's displacement was 950 cc (as built it was 600 cc) and was driven by a triple chain drive system.

The "Munro Special," as Munro called his bike, is now owned by Neville Hayes, in New Zealand's South Island, and is on display at E Hayes & Sons, Invercargill.

Bonneville Salt Flats and Speed Week
The Bonneville Salt Flats in northwestern Utah, US is known worldwide for its many miles of flat, compacted salt; perfect for testing speed machines. During Speed Week, usually in mid-late August, vehicle enthusiasts from around the world gather at Bonneville.

Munro travelled to Bonneville ten times, the first time for "sightseeing" purposes. In the nine times he raced at Bonneville, Munro set three world records: in 1962, in 1966 and in 1967.

Following the misspelling of his name in an American motorcycling magazine in 1957, Bert Munro changed his name to Burt.

Personal life
Munro and Florence Beryl Martyn were married in 1927 and had four children, June, Margaret, Gwen and John. They were divorced in 1947. A son of William Munro (?–1949) and Lily Agnes Munro (?–1967), he had two brothers and a sister. The accidental death of his older brother at the age of 13 had a profound effect on his life.

Having suffered from angina since the late 1950s, Munro suffered a stroke in 1977, and was admitted to hospital. He found his coordination had diminished. Frustrated, but wanting his motorcycles to remain in Southland, he sold both machines to his friend, Norman Hayes, of E. Hayes & Sons.
Munro died of natural causes on 6 January 1978, aged 78 years. He is buried at Invercargill's Eastern Cemetery, with his parents and brother.

Records
 In 2006, he was inducted into the AMA Motorcycle Hall of Fame.
 In 2014, 36 years after his death, he was posthumously awarded a 1967 record of 296.2593 km/h (184.087 mph) after his son John noticed a calculation error by AMA at that time.

Feature film The World's Fastest Indian
Burt Munro was the subject of a 2005 film, The World's Fastest Indian, based on a composite of his Bonneville speed runs. This film depicts a determined old man who, despite facing many difficulties, travels from New Zealand to the USA to test run his motorcycle west of the Great Salt Lake. The disclaimer says: "While this motion picture is based upon historical events, certain characters names have been changed, some main characters are composites or invented and a number of incidents fictionalised."

2013 Indian named Spirit of Munro
In March 2013, Indian Motorcycle announced that it was producing a custom-built streamliner named the Spirit of Munro. The motorcycle was built to showcase the Thunder Stroke 111 engine to be used in one of the 2014 road models. The company said the Spirit of Munro Scout was a tribute to Munro's achievements with the Indian Scout and to all Indians of old.

Notes

References

 Burt Munro: Indian Legend of Speed, George Begg (2002)

External links

 E Hayes and Sons: The World's Fastest Indian Exhibition (original motorcycles), The World's Fastest Indian Legend
 
 , a documentary
 Motorcycle Hall of Fame bio and photos
 Burt Munro Biography more detailed biography and photos
 “Hero!” article, courtesy of "Classic Bike" magazine to Granite State BMW Riders
 

1899 births
1978 deaths
Burials at Eastern Cemetery, Invercargill
Motorcycle land speed record people
New Zealand farmers
New Zealand people of Scottish descent
New Zealand motorcycle racers
People from Invercargill